Fresh is a community radio station covering the West Midlands. Fresh broadcasts from studios in Leamington Spa, Warwickshire, on the Small Scale Birmingham Multiplex and online.

History
The station was initially opened under the name Hit1FM as a hobby radio station in July 2013, by Aaron Gregory. The station was designed to target ages 16–24 living and working in the area, and achieved a listenership of approximately 1000 listeners daily via internet radio. The station spent the first three years of its broadcasting life operating from a bedroom in Coventry. The station then opted to rebrand to Fresh in January 2017 when plans to launch on digital radio were made public. Fresh serves a population of up to 900,000 people in the local area and is run by station manager Aaron Gregory alongside a team of 15 volunteer radio presenters. The station launched on the Coventry DAB multiplex on March 28 at 0800 am with an opening launch sequence.

After being on the Coventry & Warwickshire Multiplex for sometime, the station decided to come off due to a studio move to Kenilworth, Warwickshire.

Fresh maintains a large presence at local events in the community, aiming to link local residents to their community.

Daily programming includes a breakfast show, generally automated programming throughout the day, with presenter-led shows in the evening with a variety of genres.

Studios
The station moved from original studios in Leamington Spa, Warwickshire, to purpose-built studios in Kenilworth in September 2018. The station has moved to its new home back in Leamington Spa. Purpose-built studios will serve the station in its home of Chapel Court.

Ownership

The station is currently owned by Unmuted Limited.

Transmitters

Digital (DAB)

Slogans
 'Truly Local Radio for Coventry & Warwickshire'
 'The Freshest Hits For The UK'
 'Playing The Freshest Hits'

References

External links
Fresh West Midlands
Media UK station profile

Radio stations in Warwickshire
Radio stations established in 2013